Constance Elaine Britton ( Womack; born March 6, 1967) is an American actress. Britton made her feature film debut in the independent comedy-drama film The Brothers McMullen (1995), and the following year, she was cast as Nikki Faber on the ABC sitcom Spin City. She later starred in the short-lived sitcoms The Fighting Fitzgeralds (2001) and Lost at Home (2003), and appeared in several films, most notably the sports drama film Friday Night Lights (2004) and the thriller film The Last Winter (2006).

Britton starred as Tami Taylor on the NBC/DirecTV drama series Friday Night Lights from 2006 to 2011. For this role, she received positive reviews from critics and was nominated for two Emmy Awards for Outstanding Lead Actress in a Drama Series.

In 2011, she starred as Vivien Harmon in the first season of FX horror-drama series American Horror Story, for which she was nominated for the Emmy Award for Outstanding Lead Actress in a Miniseries or a Movie. She reprised her role for the eighth season of the show, Apocalypse. Britton starred as country singer Rayna Jaymes in the ABC/CMT musical drama series Nashville from 2012 to 2018, for which she was nominated for another Emmy Award for Outstanding Lead Actress in a Drama Series and a Golden Globe Award for Best Actress – Television Series Drama.

In 2016, Britton had a recurring role as socialite Faye Resnick in the first season of FX true crime anthology series American Crime Story. In 2018, she starred as Abby Clark in the Fox procedural drama series 9-1-1 as a main role in the first season and a guest in the third season, and received a Golden Globe Award nomination for Best Actress – Miniseries or Television Film for her performance as Debra Newell in the Bravo true crime anthology series Dirty John. In 2021, Britton starred in the HBO satire comedy-drama series The White Lotus alongside Jennifer Coolidge and Steve Zahn, for which she was nominated for an Emmy Award for Outstanding Supporting Actress in a Limited or Anthology Series or Movie.

In feature films, Britton starred in the romantic comedy-drama Seeking a Friend for the End of the World (2012), the romantic comedy The To Do List (2013), the comedy-dramas This Is Where I Leave You (2014) and Me and Earl and the Dying Girl (2015), the action comedy American Ultra (2015), the period drama Professor Marston and the Wonder Women (2017), the comedy-drama The Land of Steady Habits (2018), the drama Bombshell (2019) and the thriller Promising Young Woman (2020).

Early life and education
Britton was born Constance Elaine Womack in Boston, Massachusetts, to Linda Jane (née Cochran) and Edgar Allen Womack, Jr., who was a physicist and an energy company executive. She spent her early years in Rockville, Maryland.

When she was seven years old, she moved with her parents and her fraternal twin sister, Cynthia, to Lynchburg, Virginia, where she attended E. C. Glass High School and performed in plays in the E. C. Glass High School Theater; her photo is displayed in the E. C. Glass Alumni Theater. She majored in Asian studies with a concentration in Chinese at Dartmouth College, and studied at the Beijing Normal University during her freshman summer with Kirsten Gillibrand, who was later elected to the United States Senate.

After graduating in 1989, Britton (then Womack) moved to New York City, where she spent two years at the Neighborhood Playhouse School of the Theatre studying with Sanford Meisner.

Career

1995–2005: Early work

While studying at the Neighborhood Playhouse, Britton (then Womack) made her New York theatrical debut in Caroline Kava's The Early Girl at The Courtyard Playhouse.  Britton played seasoned prostitute Laurel opposite Cooper Lawrence, who played Joan. Britton's performance, while well received, nearly got her ousted from the Neighborhood Playhouse program, which prohibited students from taking professional employment during their course of study. After graduating, Britton spent two more years working in off-Broadway theatre productions. In 1995, Britton made her feature film debut in Edward Burns's comedy-drama The Brothers McMullen. She moved to Los Angeles after the film's success.

After The Brothers McMullen, Britton was cast as Heather in a recurring role in the ABC sitcom Ellen, and starred as Cammie Barbash in the unsold Fox pilot Pins and Needles. Britton was one of two finalists for the part of Dorothy Boyd opposite Tom Cruise in Cameron Crowe's romantic comedy-drama Jerry Maguire (1996), but lost the role to Renée Zellweger. In 1996, she began co-starring as Nikki Faber in the ABC sitcom Spin City opposite Michael J. Fox.  Her character was written out of the show when Charlie Sheen replaced Fox. She also appeared in the romantic comedy-drama No Looking Back (1998) and the mystery comedy-drama Looking for Kitty (2004), both directed by Edward Burns. In 2001, she co-starred opposite Chris Eigeman and Jamie Harris in the romantic comedy The Next Big Thing. She later co-starred in the independent films The Life Coach, Special Ed, The Lather Effect and The Last Winter.

After leaving Spin City, Britton had a recurring role as Maggie Kimble Hume in the short-lived CBS crime drama The Fugitive. In 2001, she played Gertrude Temple, Shirley Temple's bad mother in the ABC television film Child Star: The Shirley Temple Story, based on Temple's 1988 autobiography. In the same year, she starred as Sophie Fitzgerald in the short-lived NBC sitcom The Fighting Fitzgeralds. In 2001, Britton also had a recurring role in the NBC political drama The West Wing in the third season, appearing in the two-part premiere titled "Manchester" and the sixth episode titled "Gone Quiet" as Connie Tate, a member of Bruno Gianelli's team. In 2002, she returned to ABC and starred as Rachel Davis in the short-lived sitcom Lost at Home.  In 2006, she had a recurring role in the Fox espionage thriller 24 in the fifth season as Diane Huxley, a landlady and a brief girlfriend of Jack Bauer (Kiefer Sutherland).

2006–2011: Further recognition

Britton co-starred opposite Kyle Chandler in the NBC/DirecTV drama series Friday Night Lights as Tami Taylor, the wife of a head football coach Eric Taylor (Chandler), who becomes a high school guidance counselor. The show ran for five seasons from October 3, 2006, to February 9, 2011. During that time, Britton developed a devoted following for her performance – described by The New York Times as "something of an icon, a 40-something sex symbol and role model." She was first cast opposite Billy Bob Thornton in the film version of the series, Friday Night Lights (2004). For her role in the show, she was nominated for Primetime Emmy Award for Outstanding Lead Actress in a Drama Series in 2010 and 2011, for TCA Award for Individual Achievement in Drama in 2007 and 2008, and was awarded Satellite Award for Best Actress – Television Series Drama in 2010.

In 2009, Britton co-starred opposite Carla Gugino and her Friday Night Lights co-star Adrianne Palicki in the comedy Women in Trouble, and co-starred opposite Jackie Earle Haley, Kyle Gallner and Rooney Mara in the 2010 remake of A Nightmare on Elm Street as Dr. Gwendoline "Gwen" Holbrook. In 2011, she co-starred opposite Pamela Adlon in the romantic comedy Conception. She appeared on the WBEZ radio reading show This American Life 429th episode, "Will They Know Me at Home?", in which she performed monologues from David Finkel's nonfiction book The Good Soldiers.

In 2011, Britton starred in the first season in the FX horror drama American Horror Story. She played Vivien Harmon, who relocates with her family to California after a series of tragic marital and family issues. Unfortunately for The Harmons, the new house they purchase quickly reveals itself to be haunted. For this role she was nominated for Primetime Emmy Award for Outstanding Lead Actress in a Miniseries or a Movie in 2012. Britton had stated when she wrapped American Horror Story she would be taking a couple of months off to be with her new adopted son, but that she would then begin to re-focus on developing her FX drama collaboration with David O. Russell, but the project went into "development hell".

2012–present: Continued success
On March 6, 2012, Britton signed on to star in and produce the ABC/CMT musical drama series, Nashville created by Academy Award winner Callie Khouri. The series ran on ABC and CMT for six seasons from October 10, 2012, to July 26, 2018. She played Rayna Jaymes, a 40-year-old renowned country singer whose stardom is beginning to fade. Britton's performance received critical praise, and she was nominated for a fourth time for a Primetime Emmy Award for Outstanding Lead Actress in a Drama Series and a Golden Globe Award for Best Actress – Television Series Drama for the first time for this role. Britton, for her part, said that the most nerve-wracking part of her role, at least in the beginning, was the singing the role requires of her. The show was cancelled in May 2016 by ABC. However, in June 2016, CMT picked up the series for a fifth season. In February 2017, Britton left Nashville during the fifth season, but returned for the series finale in July 2018 as a guest star.

In 2012, Britton co-starred opposite Edward Burns in the comedy-drama The Fitzgerald Family Christmas. The film was met with positive reviews from critics. That same year, she had co-starred in the comedy-drama Seeking a Friend for the End of the World opposite Steve Carell and Keira Knightley.

In 2013, Britton co-starred opposite Aubrey Plaza in the comedy The To Do List, where she played the mother of Plaza's character. Britton returned to Austin, Texas, where Friday Night Lights was filmed, to co-star opposite Harry Connick Jr. and fellow actors and musicians Willie Nelson, Lyle Lovett and Kris Kristofferson in the Christmas family drama Angels Sing. In 2014, Britton co-starred opposite Adam Driver as a cougar therapist in the comedy-drama This Is Where I Leave You, based on Jonathan Tropper's 2009 best-selling novel.

In 2015, she co-starred opposite Thomas Mann, RJ Cyler and Olivia Cooke in the comedy-drama Me and Earl and the Dying Girl, directed by Alfonso Gomez-Rejon, and based on Jesse Andrews'‍ 2012 novel of the same name, a wry coming-of-age story about Greg (Mann), a teenage oddball forced to befriend Rachel (Cooke), a classmate with leukemia. She played Greg's mother. That same year, she co-starred in the action comedy American Ultra opposite Jesse Eisenberg and Kristen Stewart; Sharon Stone had originally been cast in her part.

In 2016, Britton reunited with American Horror Story creator Ryan Murphy in his miniseries American Crime Story: The People v. O.J. Simpson as Faye Resnick. In 2017, guest starred as Ally in the Showtime comedy series SMILF. Also in 2017, Britton starred in the comedy-drama film Beatriz at Dinner and the biographical drama Professor Marston and the Wonder Women. In 2018, she co-starred in the comedy-drama film The Land of Steady Habits.

Also in 2018, Britton starred as emergency dispatcher Abby Clark in the first season of the Fox procedural drama 9-1-1, her third collaboration with Ryan Murphy. The same year, she returned to American Horror Story for the eighth season, Apocalypse, reprising her role as Vivien Harmon. She also co-starred opposite Eric Bana as Debra Newell in the Bravo true crime anthology series Dirty John, for which she received a Golden Globe Award nomination for Best Actress – Miniseries or Television Film. In 2019, she played Roger Ailes' wife in the drama film, Bombshell. Her later film credits include Promising Young Woman (2020), Joe Bell (2020), Breaking (2022), and Luckiest Girl Alive (2022).

Britton starred as Nicole Mossbacher in the first season of HBO anthology series, The White Lotus in 2021, receiving Primetime Emmy Award for Outstanding Supporting Actress in a Limited or Anthology Series or Movie nomination (lost to her co-star Jennifer Coolidge). In 2023, she reunited with Friday Night Lights showrunner Jason Katims in the Apple TV+ drama series, Dear Edward based on the novel of the same name by Ann Napolitano. Also in 2023, Britton will appear in the dark comedy film Winner playing the role of Reality Winner's mother.

Personal life

Britton uses her married name as her stage name. She met investment banker John Britton at Alpha Delta House at Dartmouth College. They moved to Manhattan together in 1989, married on October 5, 1991, and divorced in 1995.

In November 2011, Britton adopted a son from Ethiopia.

While at Dartmouth in the late 1980s, Britton studied Chinese and lived for a summer in Beijing with future US Senator Kirsten Gillibrand. In a 2012 interview on NPR, Britton said of the experience: "I always wanted to be an actor. But when I went to college, I had to fulfill a language requirement and so I thought it would be really cool to do it speaking Chinese. My Chinese these days is real, real shaky. Let's put it this way: these days, my singing is better than my Chinese."

Britton moved to Nashville, Tennessee in 2012 when she signed to star in the ABC/CMT musical drama Nashville.

Politics 
Britton supported Hillary Clinton in 2016 United States presidential election and opposed the candidacy of Donald Trump. Britton endorsed Kirsten Gillibrand in the 2020 Democratic Party presidential primaries and appeared with her at campaign events. She also has supported senate Democrat Doug Jones over Republican Roy Moore.

On April 2, 2014, Britton became the 10th Goodwill Ambassador of the United Nations Development Programme, the anti-poverty agency of the UN. She joins celebrities such as Antonio Banderas, Maria Sharapova, Zinedine Zidane and Ronaldo in the role of UNDP Goodwill Ambassador. She focuses her advocacy efforts on eradicating extreme poverty, fighting exclusion and empowering women.

In June 2016, the Human Rights Campaign released a video in tribute to the victims of the Orlando nightclub shooting; in the video, Britton and others told the stories of the people killed there.

Filmography

Film

Television

Discography

Albums

Singles

ADid not enter the Hot 100 but charted on Bubbling Under Hot 100 Singles.

Awards and nominations

References

External links

 
 
 
 
 
 

1967 births
20th-century American actresses
21st-century American actresses
Actresses from Boston
Actresses from Massachusetts
Actresses from Virginia
American film actresses
American television actresses
American stage actresses
Dartmouth College alumni
Living people
Neighborhood Playhouse School of the Theatre alumni
Musicians from Lynchburg, Virginia
Actresses from New York City
American twins
Television producers from New York City
American women television producers
Actresses from Maryland
Musicians from Rockville, Maryland
American voice actresses
Television producers from Virginia